Widdrington is a railway station on the East Coast Main Line, which runs between  and . It is owned by Network Rail and managed by Northern Trains.

History
The station was opened by the Newcastle and Berwick Railway on 1 July 1847.

An average of 3 or 4 stopping services each way per day ran between Newcastle and Edinburgh Waverley via Berwick-upon-Tweed until the late 1980s. Following the electrification of the East Coast Main Line, these services were curtailed at Berwick-upon-Tweed. Services were further reduced to their current level by British Rail in May 1991, due to a shortage of rolling stock.

The local rail user group, SENRUG, has been campaigning to improve service levels at the station, and at neighbouring Pegswood, since September 2016.

Facilities
The station is unstaffed and has only basic amenities, consisting of a waiting shelter and timetable poster boards on both platforms, along with a public telephone on the southbound platform. Tickets must be purchased prior to travel or on the train. The old station buildings survive, but are now privately occupied. Step-free access is available to both platforms via the level crossing at the north end of the station.

Services

Northern Trains

As of the December 2021 timetable change, the station is served by one train per day (excluding Sunday) towards Chathill, and two trains towards Newcastle via Morpeth. At present, all services are operated by Northern Trains.

Rolling stock used: Class 156 Super Sprinter and Class 158 Express Sprinter

TransPennine Express
In September 2021, TransPennine Express announced that they were seeking approval to have most of the services on their new five return trains weekday semi-fast Newcastle to Edinburgh return trains call at Widdrington. As the procedure required for the operator to be recognised as meeting the safety and operational requirements necessary for calling at Widdrington were ongoing at the time of the announcement, it is possible that the service will start calling at this station at some point after its planned commencement in December 2021.

References

External links 
 
 

Railway stations in Northumberland
DfT Category F2 stations
Former North Eastern Railway (UK) stations
Railway stations in Great Britain opened in 1847
Northern franchise railway stations
1847 establishments in England